Chōshū expedition may refer to either of two military expeditions led by the Tokugawa Shogunate in Japan in the 19th century:

 First Chōshū expedition (1864)
 Second Chōshū expedition (1866)